State Route 824 (SR 824) is a state highway in Lyon County, Nevada, United States. It runs from State Route 208 (Topaz–Yerington Road) near Smith north and west to State Route 823 (Lower Colony Road).

Major intersections

References

824